Keisuke Takabatake (born March 17, 1990) is a Japanese professional basketball player who plays for Iwate Big Bulls of the B.League in Japan.

Career statistics

Regular season 

|-
| align="left" | 2012-13
| align="left" | Fukuoka
| 16 || 0 || 3.1 || 33.3 || 26.1 || 100 || 0.2 || 0.1 || 0.2 || 0 || 1.9
|-
| align="left" | 2013-14
| align="left" | Fukuoka
| 43 || 2 || 10.0 || 33.1 || 34.0 || 78.3 || 0.4 || 0.5 || 0.4 || 0 || 3.5
|-
| align="left" | 2014-15
| align="left" | Fukuoka
| 49 || 12 || 16.0 || 37.4 || 32.7 || 73.3 || 1.1 || 0.9 || 0.5 || 0 || 4.6
|-
| align="left" | 2015-16
| align="left" | Fukuoka
| 51 || 15 || 16.5 || 39.6 || 37.9 || 78.3 || 1.2 || 0.9 || 0.7 || 0.1 || 7.4
|-
| align="left" | 2016-17
| align="left" | Shimane
| 60 || 33 || 22.0 || 34.0 || 33.9 || 80.6 || 1.7 || 1.2 || 0.8 || 0.1 || 7.4
|-
| align="left" | 2017-18
| align="left" | Akita
|39 || 7||12.8 ||31.4 ||27.4 ||86.7 ||1 ||0.9 ||0.8 ||0.1 || 3.8
|-
| align="left" | 2018-19
| align="left" | Ehime
|57 || 14||20.51 ||34.1 ||33.2 ||77.4 ||2.1 ||2.1 ||0.73 ||0.07 || 8.6
|-
| align="left" | 2019-20
| align="left" | Ehime
|41 || 7||20.7 ||34.3 ||32.4 ||84.2 ||2.1 ||1.4 ||0.6 ||0.0 || 7.2
|-

Playoffs 

|-
|style="text-align:left;"|2016-17
|style="text-align:left;"|Shimane
| 4 || 3 || 16.47|| .350 || .250 || 1.000 || 1.8 || 0.8 || 0.25 || 0 || 5.0
|-
|-
|style="text-align:left;"|2017-18
|style="text-align:left;"|Akita
| 4 || 0 || 12.49 || .563 || .500 || .000 || 0.8 || 0.8 || 0.25 || 0 || 5.8
|-

Early cup games 

|-
|style="text-align:left;"|2017
|style="text-align:left;"|Akita
| 2 || 1 || 15:48 || .333 || .333 || .500 || 2.5 || 1.0 || 2.5 || 0 || 4.0
|-
|style="text-align:left;"|2018
|style="text-align:left;"|Ehime
|3 || 1 || 18:49 || .308 || .286 || .750 || 1.3 || 3.3 || 0 || 0 || 7.7
|-
|style="text-align:left;"|2019
|style="text-align:left;"|Ehime
|2 || 1 || 26:22 || .417 || .235 || .889 || 5.0 || 2.0 || 0 || 0 || 16.0
|-

Trivia
He is a sort of comedian with his Kansai accent and makes people laugh easily.

References

1990 births
Living people
Akita Northern Happinets players
Ehime Orange Vikings players
Japanese men's basketball players
Rizing Zephyr Fukuoka players
Shimane Susanoo Magic players
Sportspeople from Shiga Prefecture
Guards (basketball)
21st-century Japanese people